Andrè Signoretti (born 16 January 1979) is an Italian ice hockey player. He competed in the men's tournament at the 2006 Winter Olympics.

Career statistics

Regular season and playoffs

International

Awards and honors

References

External links
 

1979 births
Living people
Olympic ice hockey players of Italy
Ice hockey players at the 2006 Winter Olympics
Ice hockey people from Ottawa